Podróż zwana życiem (A Journey Called Life) is the thirteenth studio album by Polish hip-hop rapper and producer O.S.T.R., released on February 23, 2015 on Asfalt Records. The album features several guest appearances such by Sacha Vee and Cadillac Dale. The album was promoted with three singles, "Rise of the Sun" features Cadillac Dale, "Podróż zwana życiem" and "Ja ty my wy oni" both features a vocal by Sachą Vee. There was a promotional video clip accompanied to the first single.

It was entirely produced by Dutch duo Killing Skills and O.S.T.R., and two tracks were co-produced by ScoleX. According to Polish Society of the Phonographic Industry, on April 1, 2015 it went platinum, having sold over 30,000 copies. Due to the high selling, there were released limited editions of Pozdróż zwana życiem on blue vinyl and cassette tape. The album debuted at number 1 on the Polish OLiS chart.

Track listing

Prizes and awards 
 "The best albums of 2015 - Poland" according to Gazeta Wyborcza and Agora SA - #10

References 

O.S.T.R. albums
2015 albums
Polish-language albums